Kōenji Station (高円寺駅, Kōenji-eki) is a railway station on the Chūō Main Line in the Kōenji neighborhood in Suginami, Tokyo. The station, on a four-track section, is served by local and rapid services (not including special rapid services and other fast trains) of the Chūō Main Line on weekdays. On weekends, only local trains make stops at this station.

The station uses a special train departure melody during the Koenji Awa Odori festival held in late August.

It is within walking distance of Shin-Kōenji Station on the Tokyo Metro Marunouchi Line.

History
The station began operation on July 15, 1922. The original station building was destroyed in the bombing of Tokyo in 1945 and a permanent replacement was completed in 1952. The Chuo Line tracks originally ran at ground level but were fully elevated in April 1966, when through service to the Sobu Line and the Tozai Line commenced.

Line
East Japan Railway Company (JR East) Chūō Line

Platforms

References 

Chūō Main Line
Chūō-Sōbu Line
Stations of East Japan Railway Company
Railway stations in Tokyo
Railway stations in Japan opened in 1922